Sutil Island, formerly known as Gull Island, is a 13-acre rocky islet in the Channel Islands National Park. It is named after a ship of the Galiano expedition of 1792. It is located 0.4 miles southwest of Santa Barbara Island. It is 300 feet high. The island is an important wildlife habitat, particularly for seabirds. It is an important nesting site for Brandt's cormorant and the endangered Guadalupe murrelet, and is the only breeding site on the pacific coast of the US for the black storm petrel. It is also home to the island night lizard, which is only found on Sutil, Santa Barbara, San Nicolas and San Clemente islands.

References

Channel Islands National Park
Islands of Southern California
Islands of the Channel Islands of California
Islands of Santa Barbara County, California
Miocene volcanism
Miocene geology
Paleogene California
Uninhabited islands of California
Islands of California